Evening with Vladimir Solovyov is a Russian television talk show on Russia-1.  

The television show is hosted by Vladimir Solovyov, a controversial Russian television personality.

Controversies 
In August 2017, the Russia-1 and RTR-Planeta television channels were criticized by the Lithuanian Radio and Television Commission for inciting war and hatred through a series of broadcasts on these channels. The Lithuanian authorities were outraged by the content of the May 31, 2017 broadcast of Solovyov's program, during which LDPR leader Vladimir Zhirinovsky proposed "putting forward an ultimatum to the Baltic states so that they would withdraw all NATO troops 300 kilometres from the borders of Russia," and if they don't, then - "take certain measures". In response to the allegations, the head of the Directorate of International Relations of VGTRK, Peter Fedorov stated said that all criticism regarding the programs was unfair, and the expert's opinions are "free expression by people of their point of view".

Notes 

Russia-1 original programming
Russian television talk shows
2005 Russian television seasons
Television controversies in Russia